Bullet is a physics engine which simulates collision detection as well as soft and rigid body dynamics. It has been used in video games and for visual effects in movies. Erwin Coumans, its main author, won a Scientific and Technical Academy Award for his work on Bullet.  He worked for Sony Computer Entertainment US R&D from 2003 until 2010, for AMD until 2014, for Google until 2022 and he now works for Nvidia.

The Bullet physics library is free and open-source software subject to the terms of the zlib License. The source code is hosted on GitHub; before 2014 it was hosted on Google Code.

Features
 Rigid body and soft body simulation with discrete and continuous collision detection
 Collision shapes include: sphere, box, cylinder, cone, convex hull using GJK, non-convex and triangle mesh
 Soft body support: cloth, rope and deformable objects
 A rich set of rigid body and soft body constraints with constraint limits and motors
 Plugins for Maya, Softimage, integrated into Houdini, Cinema 4D, LightWave 3D, Blender, Godot, and Poser
 Import of COLLADA 1.4 physics content
 Optional optimizations for PlayStation 3 Cell SPU, CUDA and OpenCL

The Bullet website also hosts a Physics Forum for general discussion around physics simulation for games and animation.

At AMD Developer Summit (APU) in November 2013 Erwin Coumans presented the Bullet 3 OpenCL Rigid Body Simulation.

References

External links
 
 
 Pybullet Python bindings for Bullet, with support for Reinforcement Learning and Robotics Simulation

Computer physics engines
Software using the zlib license